John Halliday (September 14, 1880 – October 17, 1947) was an American actor of stage and screen, who often played suave aristocrats and foreigners.

Biography
Halliday was born in Brooklyn, New York. In infancy, he moved with his parents to Europe, and he lived abroad until he was 18.  

He served with the British Army 1901-02 in the Boer War in South Africa. In 1905 Halliday, a civil/mining engineer from before his South Africa adventure, migrated to Nevada and dug up a fortune in gold nuggets and managed to lose the lot. 

After losing his money in the stock market in Sacramento, Halliday became an actor with a stock theater company headed by Nat Goodwin. He progressed from that group to touring the world as leading man in a troupe headed by T. Daniel Frawley.

Making his Broadway debut in 1912 in Cecil Raleigh and Henry Hamilton's The Whip, he became a familiar presence there, especially in sophisticated comedies such as W. Somerset Maugham's The Circle (1921), Vincent Lawrence's Sour Grapes (1926), Louis Verneuil's Jealousy (1928) and S. N. Behrman's  Rain from Heaven (1934).

He was also well known for his film roles. He was one of the leading actors in the drama film Millie.  His best-known movie appearance was as "Seth Lord", father of Tracy Lord (Katharine Hepburn) in the film adaptation of Philip Barry's The Philadelphia Story (1940). The following year he played his final role in Lydia (1941).

Personal life 
In 1912, Halliday's wife, Camille Personi, sued May Buckley for alienation of affections. "'May Buckley has broken up my home and ruined my life,' Mrs. Halliday said, 'and I am determined that she shall suffer.'"  

His second wife was actress Eva Lang; they married in 1917, and divorced in 1928. In 1929, Halliday married actress Eleanor Griffith in Greenwich, Connecticut.

He died from a heart ailment at the age of 67 on October 17, 1947 in Hawaii.

Partial filmography

 The Devil's Toy (1916) - Paul La France
 The Woman Gives (1920) - Daniel Garford
 The Blue Pearl (1920) - Richard Drake
 The Love Expert (1920) - Jim Winthrop
 Masked Lover (1928)
 East Side Sadie (1929)
 Recaptured Love (1930) - Brentwood Parr
 Scarlet Pages (1930) - John Remington
 Once a Sinner (1931) - Richard Kent
 Captain Applejack (1931) - Ambrose Applejohn
 Millie (1931) - Jimmy Damier
 50 Million Frenchmen (1931) - Michael Cummins
 Father's Son (1931) - Dr. Franklin
 The Spy (1931) - Sergei Krasnoff
 Transatlantic (1931) - Henry D. Graham
 Smart Woman (1931) - Sir Guy Harrington
 Consolation Marriage (1931) - Jeff Hunter
 The Ruling Voice (1931) - Dexter Burroughs
 Men of Chance (1931) - Dorval
 The Impatient Maiden (1932) - Albert Hartman
 Week Ends Only (1932) - Arthur Ladden
 The Man Called Back (1932) - Gordon St. Claire
 Bird of Paradise (1932) - Mac
 The Age of Consent (1932) - Prof. David Mathews
 Perfect Understanding (1933) - Ivan Ronnson
 The Woman Accused (1933) - Stephen Bessemer
 Terror Aboard (1933) - Maximilian Kreig
 Bed of Roses (1933) - Stephen Paige
 The House on 56th Street (1933) - Lyndon Fiske
 A Woman's Man (1934) - Tom Cleary - Director
 Registered Nurse (1934) - Dr. Hedwig
 The Witching Hour (1934) - Jack Brookfield
 Finishing School (1934) - Mr. Frank S. Radcliff
 Return of the Terror (1934) - Dr. John Redmayne
 Housewife (1934) - Paul
 Desirable (1934) - Austin
 Happiness Ahead (1934) - Henry Bradford
 Mystery Woman (1935) - Dr. Theodore Van Wyke
 The Dark Angel (1935) - Sir George Barton
 Peter Ibbetson (1935) - The Duke of Towers
 The Melody Lingers On (1935) - Marco Turina
 Desire (1936) - Carlos Margoli
 Fatal Lady (1936) - Martan Fontes
 Three Cheers for Love (1936) - Charles Dormant
 Hollywood Boulevard (1936) - John Wellington Blakeford
 Arsène Lupin Returns (1938) - Count de Grissac
 Blockade (1938) - Andre Gallinet
 That Certain Age (1938) - Gilbert Fullerton
 Hotel for Women (1939) - John Craig
 Intermezzo (1939) - Thomas Stenborg
 Escape to Glory (1940) - John Morgan
 The Philadelphia Story (1940) - Seth Lord
 Lydia (1941) - Fitzpatrick (final film role)

References

External links

1880 births
1947 deaths
American male film actors
American male silent film actors
American male stage actors
People from Brooklyn
20th-century American male actors